Rhodolaena leroyana is a plant in the family Sarcolaenaceae. It is endemic to Madagascar. The specific epithet is for the botanist Jean-François Leroy.

Description
The twigs are hairless. The fruits are large and woody, with a fleshy involucre.

Distribution and habitat
Rhodolaena leroyana is known only from the region of Atsinanana where it is confined to Betampona Reserve. The conservation status of the species is vulnerable.

References

leroyana
Endemic flora of Madagascar
Plants described in 2000